Al-Adala Sports Club (Justice SC) is an Iraqi football club based in Al-Sha'ab, Baghdad. They currently play in the Iraq Division Two.

Current technical staff

{| class="toccolours"
!bgcolor=silver|Position
!bgcolor=silver|Name
!bgcolor=silver|Nationality
|- bgcolor=#eeeeee
|Manager:||Adel Acher||
|-
|Assistant manager:||Haider Mohi||
|-
|Assistant manager:||Malik Shalish||
|-
|Goalkeeper coach:||Wisam Abdul Aziz||
|-

Managers Stats

External links

1999 establishments in Iraq
Football clubs in Baghdad
Sport in Baghdad